"Big Foot" or "Drifting on a Reed" is a 1948 jazz standard. It was written by Charlie Parker.

See also
List of jazz standards

References

1940s jazz standards
1948 songs
Compositions by Charlie Parker